William Punton (born 18 December 1957) is an English former professional footballer who played as a goalkeeper.

Career
Born in Morpeth, Punton joined Bradford City from Gainsborough Trinity in August 1975, making 7 league appearances for the club, before being released in 1977. He later played non-league football for Leeds Ashley Road, spending time on loan with Leeds United in 1981, making one appearance for their Reserve team.

Sources

References

1957 births
Living people
English footballers
Gainsborough Trinity F.C. players
Bradford City A.F.C. players
Leeds Ashley Road F.C. players
Leeds United F.C. players
English Football League players
Association football goalkeepers